Šimon Faško (born 9 April 2006) is a Slovak footballer who plays for Železiarne Podbrezová as a midfielder.

Club career
He started his career at his hometown club ŠK Partizán Čierny Balog. He moved to Podbrezová at the age of 9.

FK Železiarne Podbrezová
Faško made his professional debut for Železiarne Podbrezová at the age of 16 years, 10 months and 2 days, against FC ViOn Zlaté Moravce on 11 February 2023.

Personal life
His older brother Michal is also footballer, currently playing for MFK Dukla Banská Bystrica.

References

External links
 FK Železiarne Podbrezová official club profile 
 
 Futbalnet profile 
 

2006 births
Living people
Sportspeople from Brezno
Slovak footballers
Slovakia youth international footballers
Association football midfielders
FK Železiarne Podbrezová players
Slovak Super Liga players